Scammarctus is a genus of crustaceans belonging to the family Scyllaridae.

The species of this genus are found in Indian Ocean.

Species:
 Scammarctus batei (Holthuis, 1946)

References

Achelata
Decapod genera